Campeprosopa is a genus of flies in the family Stratiomyidae.

Species
Campeprosopa bella Edwards, 1919
Campeprosopa borneensis Lindner, 1937
Campeprosopa flavipes Macquart, 1850
Campeprosopa longispina (Brunetti, 1913)
Campeprosopa munda Osten Sacken, 1881
Campeprosopa ornata Edwards, 1919
Campeprosopa pulchra Edwards, 1919

References

Stratiomyidae
Brachycera genera
Taxa named by Pierre-Justin-Marie Macquart
Diptera of Asia